Classic Masters is a compilation album by Seattle-based progressive metal band Queensrÿche. It was released on March 11, 2003.

Track listing

Personnel
Geoff Tate - vocals
Chris DeGarmo - guitar
Michael Wilton - guitar
Eddie Jackson - bass guitar
Scott Rockenfield - drums

References

Queensrÿche compilation albums
2003 compilation albums
Capitol Records compilation albums